George Archer "Tug" Wilson (1860 – November 28, 1914) was an American professional baseball player. He played part of one season in Major League Baseball for the Brooklyn Atlantics in 1884, usually either as an outfielder or catcher.

In 24 major league games played, Wilson batted .232, scored 13 runs, and hit four doubles. Following his brief major league career, he continued to play minor league baseball until 1896.

Wilson died in his hometown of Brooklyn, New York, and is interred at Cypress Hills Cemetery.

References

External links

Major League Baseball center fielders
Major League Baseball catchers
Brooklyn Atlantics (AA) players
Bridgeport Giants players
Newark Domestics players
Lynn (minor league baseball) players
Newburyport Clamdiggers players
Oshkosh (minor league baseball) players
Omaha Omahogs players
Omaha Lambs players
Worcester Grays players
Denver Mountaineers players
New Haven Nutmegs players
Philadelphia Athletics (minor league) players
Binghamton Bingos players
Albany Senators players
Syracuse Stars (minor league baseball) players
Atlanta Crackers players
Richmond Bluebirds players
Portsmouth Browns players
19th-century baseball players
Sportspeople from Brooklyn
Baseball players from New York City
1860 births
1914 deaths